Dhule railway station serves Dhule in Dhule district in the Indian state of Maharashtra. Dhule city has a railway terminus, which is connected to nearest railway junction at Chalisgaon. A passenger train runs between the two stations four times a day. The train also carries reserved coaches for Mumbai and Pune, which are connected to another train from Chalisgaon onwards.

History
The Chalisgaon–Dhulia branch line emanates from the Bombay–Bhusawal route at Chalisgaon, and runs in the northern direction to enter Dhule district wherein it terminates at Dhule.

This line was opened for traffic in 1900. It is a broad-gauge (5ft 6in) single line and has about 17 miles length in the district. Jamda and Rajmane, respectively 9 and 15 miles away from Chalisgaon are the only two stations in the district on this route.

Railways in the Chalisgaon to Dhule area are now electrified.

References

External links

  Ministry of Indian Railways, Official website

Railway terminus in India
Railway stations in Dhule district
Bhusawal railway division